Chalepensin is a chemical compound of the furanocoumarin class.   Originally isolated in 1967 from fringed rue (Ruta chalepensis), from which it derives its name, it has also been found in other plants of the genus Ruta including common rue (Ruta graveolens) and mountain rue (Ruta montana).

Chemical properties
Chalepensin forms colorless crystalline needles with a melting point of 82-83 °C.

Research
Chalepensin has been shown to have antifertility effects in female rats.  This may be the result of toxic effects chalepensin has on the ovaries.  This antifertility effect may provide some scientific evidence in support of the traditional uses of fringed rue and modern use of rue oil (oil from plants of the genus Ruta) in South America as an abortifacient.

Chalepensis has also been shown to have antibacterial activity against Streptococcus mutans and methicillin-resistant Staphylococcus aureus (MRSA).

Related compounds
Several chemical compounds that have the same core chemical structure as chalepsin are known, including chalepin, rutamarin, 5-methoxychalepensin, and 5,8-dimethoxychalepensin.

References

Furanocoumarins